SunRail Poinciana station is a train station in the community of Poinciana, Florida. It is the southern terminus of SunRail, the commuter rail service of Greater Orlando. The station opened on July 30, 2018. The site was briefly used by Amtrak from 1974 to 1975.

History
In the mid-1970s, the site was planned as the southern terminus for Amtrak's inaugural auto ferry service called AutoTrak connecting Florida to Indianapolis Union Station, in competition with the Auto-Train Corporation's Auto-Train service. Amtrak initially built a complex with a 1,600 square foot modular building, a parking lot and two spur-lines with eventual plans for a 7,000 square foot facility. The initial complex opened on September 16, 1974, with the simultaneous arrival of the Floridian and the Champion trains. It was envisioned to be the official stop for tourists bound for Walt Disney World. The AutoTrak service never came to life, however, and the station was used for just over a year as a stop for the Champion and the Floridian until December 12, 1975, when those trains began stopping at Kissimmee instead. Sometime in the 1980s, the station building was demolished, the spur-lines were removed and the parking lot along with the access road into the site were abandoned and eventually overgrew with vegetation over the years. The site sat vacant until construction of the Poinciana SunRail station began in early 2016.

References

External links
 SunRail's Station Development Sketchbook

Former Amtrak stations in Florida
Railway stations in the United States opened in 1974
Railway stations in the United States opened in 2018
Railway stations closed in 1975
SunRail stations
1974 establishments in Florida
1975 disestablishments in Florida
2018 establishments in Florida